Alexandra-Georgiana Subțirică-Iovănescu (born 8 December 1987) is a Romanian handball player who plays as a pivot for the Gloria Buzău and the Romanian national team.

She represented Romania at the 2020 European Women's Handball Championship.

Achievements  
Cupa României : 
Bronze Medalist: 2020

Personal life
She's the daughter of the former international and long-term captain of Romania, Simona Iovănescu. Her father was Sevastian Iovănescu.

References

External links

1987 births
Living people
Sportspeople from Constanța
Romanian female handball players